

Events 
 January 31 – Pedro Bermúdez is dismissed from the position of maestro de capilla of the collegiate church at Antequera and briefly imprisoned, for gross negligence and a fight with one of his tenors.
 November 15 – Tobias Kühn is appointed to a musical post as a singer but also as a lutenist at the court in Wolfenbüttel.

Publications 
 Felice Anerio – First book of madrigals for five voices (Venice: Giacomo Vincenti)
 Giammateo Asola
 for eight voices (Venice: Ricciardo Amadino), also includes a Magnificat
 for three voices, book 2 (Venice: Giacomo Vincenti), a madrigal cycle, setting Petrarch's 
Madrigals for two voices (Venice: Giacomo Vincenti)
 Ippolito Baccusi – Fourth book of madrigals for six voices (Venice: Angelo Gardano)
 Ludovico Balbi –  for four voices (Venice: Angelo Gardano)
 Giovanni Bassano – Canzonettas for four voices (Venice: Giacomo Vincenti)
 Johannes Eccard –   for five voices (Königsberg: Georg Osterberger), a wedding song
 Alfonso Ferrabosco the elder
First book of madrigals for five voices (Venice: Angelo Gardano)
Second book of madrigals for five voices (Venice: Angelo Gardano)
 Andrea Gabrieli & Giovanni Gabrieli – Concerti (Venice: Angelo Gardano), the majority of the pieces are by Andrea, published posthumously
 Vincenzo Galilei – Second book of madrigals for four and five voices (Venice: Angelo Gardano)
 Jacobus Gallus – , volumes 2 & 3 (Prague: Georg Nigrinus)
 Marc'Antonio Ingegneri
Second book of masses for five voices (Venice: Ricciardo Amadino)
Fifth book of madrigals for five voices (Venice: Angelo Gardano)
 Orlande de Lassus – Madrigals for four, five, and six voices (Nuremberg: Catharina Gerlach), his seventh and final book of only madrigals
 Carolus Luython –  for six voices (Prague: Georg Nigrinus), a collection of motets
 Giovanni de Macque – Second book of madrigals for five voices (Venice: Giacomo Vincenti)
 Luca Marenzio
Fourth book of madrigals for six voices (Venice: Giacomo Vincenti)
 Tiburtio Massaino
 for four voices (Venice: Angelo Gardano)
Second book of masses for five voices (Venice: Angelo Gardano)
Third book of madrigals for five voices (Venice: Angelo Gardano)
 Rinaldo del Mel – Third book of madrigals for five voices (Venice: Angelo Gardano)
 Philippe de Monte
First book of masses (Antwerp: Christophe Plantin)
Second book of motets for six voices (Venice: Angelo Gardano)
Twelfth book of madrigals for five voices (Venice: Angelo Gardano)
 Claudio Monteverdi –  (Venice: Angelo Gardano), a book of madrigals
 Jakob Paix –  (Lauingen, Leonhard Reinmichel)
Giovanni Pierluigi da Palestrina – Second book of motets for four voices
Benedetto Pallavicino – First book of madrigals for six voices (Venice: Giacomo Vincenti)

Compositions 

Births 
February 26 (baptized) – Stefano Landi, Roman composer and teacher (died 1639)
September 18 – Francesca Caccini, Florentine composer and lutenist (died after 1641)
November 3 (baptized) – Samuel Scheidt, German composer (died 1654)
date unknown – Francesco Lambardi, Neapolitan composer (died 1642)

Deaths 
February 9 – Vincenzo Ruffo, Veronese composer (born 1508)
June 15 – Giovanni Battista Pinello di Ghirardi, Italian composer and singer (born c.1544)
August 29 – Vincenzo Bellavere, Venetian composer (born c.1540/1541)

References

 
Music
16th century in music
Music by year